The R40 Live Tour was the final tour by Canadian rock band Rush that commemorated the 40th anniversary of drummer Neil Peart joining the band in July 1974. The title hearkens back to Rush's 2004 R30: 30th Anniversary Tour that celebrated the 30th anniversary of the band. The tour grossed US$37.8 million, with 442,337 tickets sold at 35 concerts. Although the tour was shorter than many of Rush’s preceding tours, it was very successful in terms of average concert attendance and gross, which was 12,638 and US$1,080,000 respectively. The tour also saw more sellouts than any other Rush tour in recent memory. With 26 out of the 33 reported shows being sellouts, and the remaining 7 still over 90% capacity, the band felt a taste of their success from their prime years again.

Films

The shows performed on June 17 and 19, 2015, at the Air Canada Centre in Toronto were filmed and released as the concert film R40 Live on November 20, 2015. A documentary titled Rush: Time Stand Still was released in November 2016, dealing with the band's preparations for the tour and their experiences during it. The film was narrated by Paul Rudd and directed by Dale Heslip.

Live album
Rush recorded two of their shows in June in Toronto for a live album released on November 20, 2015.  They also recorded "The Wreckers" in Buffalo, NY at the show on June 10, 2015 for the album, as well as "The Camera Eye" at the show in Kansas City, MO on July 9, 2015. The live album R40 Live  reached number one on Billboard Top Rock Albums chart.

Book
Neil Peart released a book about the tour titled Far and Wide: Bring That Horizon to Me! on September 13, 2015.

Set list

First set
"The World Is... The World Is" (video introduction)
"The Anarchist" or "Clockwork Angels" (only on May 8 in Tulsa, Oklahoma)
"Clockwork Angels" or "The Wreckers"†
"Headlong Flight" (with "Drumbastica", Neil Peart drum solo)
"Far Cry"
"The Main Monkey Business"
"One Little Victory" or "How It Is"
"Animate"
"Roll the Bones"
"Distant Early Warning" or "Between the Wheels"
"Losing It"†
"Subdivisions"

Second set
"No Country for Old Hens" (video introduction)
"Tom Sawyer"
"Red Barchetta", "The Camera Eye", or "YYZ"
"The Spirit of Radio"
"Natural Science" (only when "YYZ" was performed)
"Jacob's Ladder"
"Cygnus X-1 Book II: Hemispheres"1. "Prelude"
"Cygnus X-1 Book I: The Voyage"1. "Prologue"2. "Part 1"3. "The Story So Far" (Neil Peart drum solo)4. "Part 3"
"Closer to the Heart"
"Xanadu"
"2112"I. "Overture"II. "The Temples of Syrinx"IV. "Presentation"VII. "Grand Finale"

Encore
"Mel's Rock Pile" starring Eugene Levy (video introduction)
"Lakeside Park"
"Anthem"
"What You're Doing"
"Working Man" (featuring intro excerpt of "Garden Road")
"Exit Stage Left" (video outro)

† "Clockwork Angels" / "The Wreckers" were not played June 19 in Toronto, June 27 in Newark, New Jersey, June 29 in New York, New York, July 17 in Vancouver, BC and August 1 in Los Angeles, California. At those five shows, they were replaced by "Losing It," which was played prior to "Subdivisions."

Tour dates

References

Bibliography
 Daly and Hansen. Rush: Wandering the Face of the Earth: The Official Touring History. Insight Editions, 2019. 

Rush (band) concert tours
2015 concert tours
Farewell concert tours